Borislava Milkova Ivanova (born November 24, 1966) is a Bulgarian sprint canoer who competed in the late 1980s. She won a bronze medal in the K-4 500 m event at the 1988 Summer Olympics in Seoul.

References
Sports-reference.com profile

1966 births
Bulgarian female canoeists
Canoeists at the 1988 Summer Olympics
Living people
Olympic canoeists of Bulgaria
Olympic bronze medalists for Bulgaria
Olympic medalists in canoeing

Medalists at the 1988 Summer Olympics